Jean-Paul P. Poulain (March 18, 1945 – April 24, 2007) was a famous Maine Franco-American Cabaret recording artist . He was a worldwide act who received international acclaim. The last years of Poulain's life were troubled and he was shot and killed on April 24, 2007.

References

External links
Morning Sentinel Story
Official Site

2007 deaths
Cabaret singers
American people of French descent
1945 births